John Fraser Michie (25 October 1908 – 1983) was a Scottish athlete who competed in the 1934 British Empire Games.

At the 1934 Empire Games, he won the bronze medal in the high jump event. In the 440 yards competition, he was eliminated in the heats.

External links
commonwealthgames.com results

1908 births
1983 deaths
Scottish male sprinters
Scottish male high jumpers
Athletes (track and field) at the 1934 British Empire Games
Athletes (track and field) at the 1938 British Empire Games
Commonwealth Games bronze medallists for Scotland
Commonwealth Games medallists in athletics
Medallists at the 1934 British Empire Games